The 17th century BC was the century that lasted from 1700 BC to 1601 BC.

Events

c. 1700 BC: Indus Valley civilisation comes to an end but is continued by the Cemetery H culture.
1700 BC: Belu-bani became the King of Assyria.
c. 1700 BC: Minoan Old Palace period ends and Minoan Second Palace period starts in Ancient Greece.
c. 1700 BC: beginning of the Late Minoan period on Crete.
c. 1700 BC: Aegean metalworkers are producing decorative objects rivaling those of Ancient Near East jewelers, whose techniques they seem to borrow.
c. 1700 BC: Lila-Ir-Tash started to rule the Elamite Empire.
c. 1700 BC: 1450 BC: Young girl gathering saffron crocus flowers, detail of wall painting, Room 3 of House Xeste 3, Akrotiri (prehistoric city), Thera, is made. Second Palace period. It is now kept in Thera Foundation, Petros M. Nomikos, Greece.
c. 1700 BC: Bronze Age starts in China.
c. 1698 BC: Lila-Ir-Tash the ruler of the Elamite Empire died. Temti-Agun I started to rule the Elamite Empire.
1691 BC: Belu-bani, the King of Assyria died.
c. 1690 BC: Temti-Agun I, the ruler of the Elamite Empire, died. Tan-Uli started to rule the Elamite Empire.
1690 BC: Libaia became the King of Assyria.
c. 1680 BC: Egypt: Development of leavened bread (date approximate).
c. 1673 BC: Sharma-Adad I became the King of Assyria.
c. 1661 BC: Iptar-Sin became the King of Assyria.
c. 1655 BC: Tan-Uli, the ruler of the Elamite Empire, died.
c. 1650 BC: Collapse of the 14th Dynasty of Egypt.
c. 1650 BC: Conquest of Memphis by the Hyksos and collapse of the 13th Dynasty of Egypt.
c. 1650 BC: Start of the 15th (Hyksos) and 16th Dynasties of Egypt.
c. 1650 BC: Possibly, start of the Abydos Dynasty in Upper Egypt.
c. 1646 BC or earlier: Jie of Xia is overthrown by Tang of Shang (ca. 1675-1646 BC) in the Battle of Mingtiao.
1649 BC: Bazaia became the King of Assyria.
 1633 BC – May 2 – Lunar Saros 34 begins.
1627 BC: Beginning of a cooling of world climate lasting several years recorded in tree-rings all over the world. It may have been caused by one, or more, volcanic eruptions e.g. the Minoan eruption of Thera, the Avellino eruption of Mount Vesuvius, and/or the eruption of Mount Aniakchak in Alaska.
1625 BC: Samsu-Ditana becomes King of Babylon (middle chronology).
1621 BC: Lullaia becomes the King of Assyria.
1620 BC: Mursili I becomes King of the Hittite Empire (middle chronology).
1615 BC: Shu-Ninua became the King of Assyria.
c. 1600 BC: Tang of Shang established the Shang Dynasty.

Deaths
 1684 BC – Heremon, Irish legend

Extinctions
 The last known population of woolly mammoth, preserved on Wrangel Island, becomes extinct.

Sovereign states
See: List of sovereign states in the 17th century BC.

References

 

 
-3
-83